Janardan Rai Nagar Rajasthan Vidyapeeth (Deemed-to-be University) is a Deemed University in the city of Udaipur in the Indian state of Rajasthan. It got the status of deemed university in 1987. It is one of the oldest universities of Udaipur. The courses of the University are approved by UGC, AICTE, CCH, NCTE, BCI and other councils.
https://www.ugc.ac.in/deemeduniversitylist.aspx?id=iPeGxuvbrQSd3xnq6sfJuA==&Unitype=Jc2qxh2PCqffjt5wPbleBA==

References 

https://www.ugc.ac.in/deemeduniversitylist.aspx?id=iPeGxuvbrQSd3xnq6sfJuA==&Unitype=Jc2qxh2PCqffjt5wPbleBA==

External links
University website

Deemed universities in Rajasthan
Universities in Udaipur
1937 establishments in India
Educational institutions established in 1937

https://www.ugc.ac.in/deemeduniversitylist.aspx?id=iPeGxuvbrQSd3xnq6sfJuA==&Unitype=Jc2qxh2PCqffjt5wPbleBA==